André Thome (24 October 1879 – 10 March 1916) was a French politician. He served as a member of the Chamber of Deputies from 1914 to 1916, representing Seine-et-Oise.

Thome was killed on 10 March 1916 at Marre, near Chattancourt, during the Battle of Verdun. He received the Légion d'honneur posthumously on 23 April 1916.

References

1879 births
1916 deaths
Politicians from Paris
Democratic Republican Alliance politicians
Members of the 11th Chamber of Deputies of the French Third Republic
French military personnel killed in World War I
Recipients of the Legion of Honour